Kabi-Kahini (Bengali: কবি-কাহিনী; English: The Tale of the Poet) is a Bengali poetry book written by  Rabindranath Tagore in 1878 at the age of 16. It was his first published  literary work or book of poems. The poems were published in the "Bharati" literary magazine regularly. It has 53 pages. His friend Prabodhchandra Ghosh was the publisher of the book.

References
     

Bengali poetry collections
1878 poems
Poetry collections by Rabindranath_Tagore
Bengali-language_literature
1878 poetry books
Rabindranath_Tagore